The 1948 United States Senate election in Wyoming was held on November 2, 1948. First-term Republican Senator Edward V. Robertson ran for re-election to a second term. He was challenged in the general election by Democrat Lester C. Hunt, the Governor of Wyoming. Aided in part by President Harry S. Truman's narrow victory in Wyoming over Republican Thomas E. Dewey, and with his own record of winning statewide in Wyoming, Hunt defeated Robertson in a landslide. However, Hunt would not serve a full term in the Senate; he died by suicide on June 19, 1954 and Republican Edward D. Crippa was appointed to replace him.

Democratic primary

Candidates
 Lester C. Hunt, Governor of Wyoming
 Carl A. Johnson

Results

Republican Primary

Candidates
 Edward V. Robertson, incumbent U.S. Senator

Results

General election

Results

References

Wyoming
1948
1948 Wyoming elections